The Wellington Brass Band (Wellington Brass, WBB) is a British-style brass band based in Wellington, New Zealand. The 28-piece ensemble performs extensively throughout New Zealand and Australia, and is the current champion band of New Zealand and Australia.

Ensemble

The band's original name was the "Wellington Corporation Tramways Band" and it was formed in 1905. For over 50 years the band retained close links with the tramways staff (many were playing members) and its practice rooms were a hall adjacent to the Newtown tram sheds.
The band moved to its present location at the west side of the Ngaio Railway Station, off Collingwood Street in 1964. At this stage it had recently changed its name to Onslow Brass Band. The Ngaio hall had been built by local Returned Services Association members and the band was eventually able to first, acquire the building and then, second, buy the land. After many years of fundraising a new band room was built and this was officially opened by the Mayor of Wellington, Ms Kerry Prendergast, on Saturday 5 April 2003.
The next major milestone was when the band accepted an offer of sponsorship from the "Evening Post", Wellington's premier newspaper. This was a very happy association for both parties. In 1981, in recognition of The Evening Post becoming the band's principal sponsor, the band adopted it as part of its name: The Evening Post Onslow Brass Band. That year the band won its second National A Grade title under the late Norman Goffin QSO (Musical Director 1960–83). In 1998, after consultation with The Evening Post, the band changed its name to The Evening Post Wellington Brass Band, to better reflect its position as the city's sole brass band, and the Wellington Region's only A-Grade band.
With the merging of the Evening Post and The Dominion newspapers in 2002, Wellington Brass began the search for a new principal sponsor.  
Today, under the leadership of current Musical Director David Bremner, Wellington Brass has had its most successful contesting period winning a hat-trick of NZ National titles and doing "the double" by winning the Australian and NZ titles in the same year (2015). In 2013 Wellington Brass organised the inaugural Oktoberfest: The Bavarian Showdown on Wellington’s waterfront which was attended by thousands of Wellingtonians. The band has a highly active involvement in music education and teaching in the community, performing at many primary schools each year to promote and encourage kids to get involved in music.

National titles
1911 B Grade Championship- Palmerston North
1937 B Grade Quickstep, Championship – Nelson
1953 C Grade Championship – Wanganui
1963 B Grade Quickstep – Wellington
1965 B Grade Championship – Auckland 
1969 A Grade Championship – Rotorua
1971 A Grade Hymn – Wanganui
1973 A Grade Test – Wellington
1981 A Grade Hymn, Test, Championship – Wellington
1982 A Grade Own Choice – Dunedin
1983 A Grade Test – Sydney (Aus)
2005 B Grade Hymn, Test, Own Choice, Championship – Wellington
2007 B Grade Test, Own Choice, Championship – Auckland 
2008 B Grade Test, Own Choice, Championship – Christchurch
2008 B Grade Hymn, Test, Own Choice, Championship – Brisbane (Aus)
2012 A Grade Hymn, Test – Timaru
2013 A Grade Hymn, Test, Championship – New Plymouth
2014 A Grade Hymn, Test, Championship – Invercargill
2015 A Grade Hymn, Own Choice, Stage March, Championship – Sydney (Aus)
2015 A Grade Hymn, Own Choice, Championship – Rotorua
2016 A Grade Test, Own Choice, Championship – Napier
2018 A Grade Hymn, Own Choice, Championship – Blenheim
2019 A Grade Hymn, Test, Own Choice, Championship – Hamilton
2021 A Grade Hymn, Test, Championship – Christchurch
2022 A Grade Hymn, Test, Championship – Wellington

Musical directors
G. Bowes 1920–21
T. Goodall 1921–29
E. Franklin 1930–45, 1948–53
B. Zinsli 1945–48
N. Goffin QSM 1953–60, 60–1983
D. Bly 1983–86, 95–96
P. Swartz 1986–92
A. McFarlane 1993
H. Aldred 1994
D. Brell 1996–97, 1999–2001
G. Moverley 1997–98
A. McFarlane 2001–2003
C. Collings 2003–04
D. Chaulk 2004–05
M. Oldershaw 2005–06
D. Bremner 2006–present

References

External links
 Wellington Brass Band

Musical groups from Wellington
Brass bands
Musical groups established in 1905
1905 establishments in New Zealand